Gastrolepta   is a genus of flies in the family Tachinidae.

Species
G. anthracina <small>(Meigen, 1826)

References

Diptera of Europe
Exoristinae
Tachinidae genera
Taxa named by Camillo Rondani